Andre Agassi defeated the defending champion Stefan Edberg in the final, 5–7, 7–6(7–5), 7–5, 6–2 to win the singles title at the 1990 ATP Tour World Championships.

Draw

Finals

Arthur Ashe group
Standings are determined by: 1. number of wins; 2. number of matches; 3. in two-players-ties, head-to-head records; 4. in three-players-ties, percentage of sets won, or of games won; 5. steering-committee decision.

Cliff Drysdale group
Standings are determined by: 1. number of wins; 2. number of matches; 3. in two-players-ties, head-to-head records; 4. in three-players-ties, percentage of sets won, or of games won; 5. steering-committee decision.

See also
 ATP World Tour Finals appearances

References

 ATP Tour World Championships Singles Draw

Singles
Tennis tournaments in Germany
1990 in German tennis
Sports competitions in Frankfurt